The red-headed manakin (Ceratopipra rubrocapilla) is a species of bird in the family Pipridae. It is found in Bolivia, Brazil, and Peru. Its natural habitat is subtropical or tropical moist lowland forest.

References

red-headed manakin
Birds of the Amazon Basin
Birds of the Atlantic Forest
red-headed manakin
Birds of Brazil
Taxonomy articles created by Polbot